Rhett Marques (born December 3, 1972) is an American politician and businessman serving as a member of the Alabama House of Representatives from the 91st district. He assumed office on November 7, 2018.

Early life and education 
Marques was born in Spanish Fort, Alabama. After graduating from Fairhope High School in 1990, he earned a Bachelor of Science degree in marketing from the University of Alabama in 1994.

Career 
Marques is the owner of Goodson Tire & Auto in Enterprise, Alabama. He was elected to the Alabama House of Representatives in 2018. Marques is also a member of the House Health Committee.

References 

Living people
1972 births
University of Alabama alumni
People from Enterprise, Alabama
People from Coffee County, Alabama
Republican Party members of the Alabama House of Representatives
Businesspeople from Alabama
21st-century American politicians